Stefan Georgiev Staykov (born 3 October 1949) is a former Bulgarian football goalkeeper who played for Bulgaria in the 1974 FIFA World Cup. He is a former soccer player / goalkeeper / of Spartak (Varna), Levski (Sofia), Osam (Lovech), Lokomotiv (Plovdiv), and Omonia Aradippou (Cyprus). He is a 3 times champion of Bulgaria and 3 times winner of the Bulgarian national cup. He is a former international participant in the Soccer World Cup in 1974, and former assistant - coach of Levski Sofia.

Honours
Levski Sofia

 Bulgarian A PFG – 1974, 1977, 1979
 Bulgarian Cup – 1976, 1977, 1979

References

External links

Profile at levskisofia.info

1949 births
Living people
Footballers from Sofia
Bulgarian footballers
Bulgarian expatriate footballers
Bulgaria international footballers
Association football goalkeepers
PFC Spartak Varna players
PFC Levski Sofia players
PFC Litex Lovech players
PFC Lokomotiv Plovdiv players
Omonia Aradippou players
1974 FIFA World Cup players
Expatriate footballers in Cyprus
First Professional Football League (Bulgaria) players
Bulgarian expatriate sportspeople in Cyprus